Nephrotoma australasiae  the tiger crane fly is a species of fly in the family Tipulidae. It is found in Australia .

References

Tipulidae
Insects described in 1890
Nematoceran flies of Europe

Taxa named by Frederick A. Askew Skuse